Philomina (1926 – 2 January 2006) was an Indian actress, who worked in the Malayalam film industry. She acted in more than 750 films in her career. She played mostly character and comedy roles, besides that of mother and grandmother. She started acting on the stage. This experience stood her in good stead when she was offered her first film role. The character of Anappara Achamma in the 1991 film Godfather, portrayed by her is acknowledged to be one of the most powerful roles ever in Malayalam cinema.

Early life
Philomina entered the film industry with eight years of experience in professional drama, she worked with the drama troupe of P. J. Antony. She used to say it was her initial experience with an actor like Antony that helped shape her film career.

Her parents were perturbed when she had to travel to Chennai for the first shoot. It was Moidu Padiyathu who convinced her parents. Her first movie, Kuttikkuppayam (1964), produced by T. E. Vasudevan and directed by M. Krishnan Nair was a big hit. Philomina played the role of Prem Nazir's mother, a Muslim character.

Personal life

She was born to Devassia and Mariam in 1926 at Mullurkara in Thrissur. She had her primary education from Valapad GVHS School.

Her father died when she was 12. She used to sing at church choir. When her father died she started singing for dramas to make a living. Later she started acting in dramas and then moved to movies.

She married Antony, a theater artist, in 1956, but lost her husband when her only son Joseph was three years old.

Film career
Philomina won her first State award, for the best supporting actress, in 1970 for her roles in films Thurakkathavaathil and Olavum Theeravum. In 1987, she received the award for the second time for Thaniyavarthanam.

Somewhere during this time, there was a short break in her career. She came back in the films of Bharathan and Padmarajan. Her roles in films like Chatta, Innale, Njan Gandharvan, Venkalam, Churam, Vietnam Colony, Kudumbapuranam, Godfather, Uppukandam Brothers, Thalayana Manthram and Kakkothikkavile Appooppan Thaadikal would also be remembered for long time.

It was Sathyan Anthikkad who first cast Philomina in a comic role. The film Madanmaar Londonil, gave this talented actress a new image. Her roles in films like Malayogam, Kireedam, Uncle Bun, Manathe Kottaram, Vrudhanmare Sookshikkuka and In Harihar Nagar.

In a career spanning over four decades Philomina starred in 750 films and numerous television serials. She was last seen in Meerayude Dukhavum Muthuvinte Swapnavum.

Later life
Philomina was living in a small, well done-up apartment in Kochi till she moved to her son's place in Chennai a couple of years before her death. She was a chronic diabetic and suffered stroke in 2005. She was getting insulin shots for her diabetic condition. She was bed-ridden for over a month before she died at her son- Joseph's residence in Chennai due to diabetes related problems on 2 January 2006, aged 79.

Awards
Kerala State Film Awards:
 Second Best Actress – 1970 – Thurakkatha Vathil, Olavum Theeravum
 Second Best Actress – 1987 – Thaniyavarthanam
Kerala Film Critics Award:

 Best Second Actress - 1991 - Godfather

Partial filmography

2000s

1990s

1980s

1970s

1960s

TV Serial
Sthree
Janakaeeyam Janaki
Shankupushpam
Thamarakkuzhali
Punnakka Vikasana Corporation
Kudumba Visheyshangal

Drama
 Pooja
 Sagara Rajakumari - radio drama

As a singer
 Achamakuttiyude Achayan 1998
 "Kunjiyammakku Anchu Makkalane" (Adukkala Rahasyam Angadi Paattu) 1997
 "Muthani Munthiri" (Pookkalam Varavayi) 1991

References

External links
Philomina at MSI

1926 births
2006 deaths
Actresses from Kerala
Indian film actresses
Kerala State Film Award winners
Actresses in Malayalam cinema
People from Thrissur district
20th-century Indian actresses
21st-century Indian actresses
Actresses in Malayalam television
Actresses from Thrissur